Marion Dickerman (April 11, 1890 – May 16, 1983) was an American suffragist, educator, vice-principal of the Todhunter School, and a close friend of Eleanor Roosevelt.

Birth and early life
Born in Westfield, New York, she studied for two years at Wellesley College before transferring to Syracuse University where she was an avid supporter of women's suffrage. She graduated with a bachelor of arts in 1911 and a graduate degree in education in 1912.

Career

She taught first at Canisteo, New York, and in 1913 moved to Fulton, New York, where she taught American history at Fulton High School, eventually becoming head of the department. It was here that she met Syracuse classmate Nancy Cook, who taught arts and handicrafts at the same school. These two women become lifelong partners, spending almost their entire adult lives together, sharing a life dedicated to politics, education, and progressive reform.

Her respect for Woodrow Wilson's vision overcame her strong antiwar sentiments and she and Cook both became active in the Red Cross. As Dickerman later recounted, she "really believed this was a war to end wars and make the world safe for democracy." In 1918, they both traveled to London to assist the women-staffed Endell Street Military Hospital.

After their return she briefly entertained political aspirations but accepted the position of dean at the Trenton State College in Trenton, New Jersey in 1921. Unhappy there, she one year later joined the faculty of the Todhunter school. Cook who was now the executive secretary of the Women's Division of the State Democratic Committee would travel together with her in 1922 to Hyde Park where they would meet Eleanor Roosevelt. Franklin Roosevelt offered the three women a lifetime lease on some property near Vall-Kill Creek to build a cottage. A small handicraft workshop was also built, which became known as Vall-Kill Industries.

In 1927, Dickerman, Roosevelt, and Cook purchased the Todhunter School, with Dickermn becoming principal. Eleanor spent some time there as a teacher. Todhunter later became affiliated with the Dalton School. In 1929 Dickerman, Cook and Eleanor Roosevelt visited Europe.

Lorena Hickok took an active dislike to her and this started to unravel the relationship between the three. By 1936 Val-Kill Industries was disbanded. Dickerman and Cook continued to live in Stone Cottage until after Franklin D. Roosevelt's death in 1945. They sold all interest in the Val-Kill property to Eleanor in 1947 when they moved to New Canaan, Connecticut, where Dickerman became the educational programming director for the Marine Historical Association, which later became Mystic Seaport, the Museum of America and the Sea. She served as the museum's Director of Education, a post she held from 1946 until 1962.

Dickerman was active in numerous organizations, including the American Association of University Women as president of the New York State Division.

She died in 1993 at the age of 96 at the Crossroads retirement home in Kennett Square, Pennsylvania, and is buried next to Nancy Cook at Westfield Cemetery, Westfield, New York.

References

Sources
 Cook, Blanche Wiesen. Eleanor Roosevelt: Volume One, 1884-1933. New York: Viking Press, 1993
 Cook, Blanche Wiesen. Eleanor Roosevelt: Volume Two, 1933-1938. New York: Viking Press, 1999
Davis, Kenneth. Invincible Summer: An Intimate Portrait of the Roosevelts Based on the Recollections of Marion Dickerman. New York: Atheneum Press, 1974

External links

1890 births
1983 deaths
American educational theorists
20th-century American educators
American women's rights activists
People from Westfield, New York
People from Fulton, Oswego County, New York
People from Hyde Park, New York
Activists from New York (state)